Tina Pinnock, (born July 5, 1991) known professionally as HoodCelebrityy, is a Jamaican dancehall singer and songwriter. Born and raised in Portmore, Jamaica, Tina migrated to The Bronx, New York City at the age of 12. Currently signed to Epic Records, she released two mixtapes in 2017, Can't Believe It's Just a Girl and Trap Vs. Reggae. The latter album peaked at number 9 on the Billboard Reggae Albums chart. Her 2017 single, "Walking Trophy," peaked at number 22 on the R&B/Hip-Hop Airplay chart.

Early life
Tina Pinnock was born and raised in Saint Catherine Parish and Portmore, Jamaica. When she was 12, Pinnock and her family moved to The Bronx, New York. Prior to achieving fame, she worked at a clothing store and uploaded 15-second freestyle videos on her Instagram account.

Career
HoodCelebrityy's breakout came in 2015 when friend and future collaborator, Cardi B, posted about her song, "Wine Pon It". The song went viral soon after. In 2016, HoodCelebrityy was featured on the Jubilee song, "Wine Up." She would later be signed by the management company and record label, KSR Group. In January 2017, she appeared on Cardi B's mixtape, Gangsta Bitch Music, Vol. 2, on the song "Back It Up" which also featured Konshens. That same month, she released the lead single, "The Takeover", off of her debut mixtape, Can't Believe It's Just a Girl. The mixtape was released in the spring of that year.

In August 2017, HoodCelebrityy released her second mixtape, Trap Vs. Reggae, which featured the song "Island Girls," a collaboration with Cardi B and Josh X. The mixtape would later peak at number 9 on the Billboard Reggae Albums chart. Later in 2017, she released the single, "Walking Trophy." She was also featured on the remix of the French Montana song, "Famous." The video for "Walking Trophy" was directed by Mazi O and released in February 2018. The song has thus far peaked at number 22 on the Billboard R&B/Hip-Hop Airplay chart.

In May 2018, HoodCelebrityy was signed to Epic Records. Later that month, she and Tory Lanez were featured on the Megan Ryte track, "On & On." She performed at the 2018 Summer Jam.

On August 30, 2019 HoodCelebrityy released a single called "Bum Pon It" on her Official Youtube page. The song is caters to women and is being played at numerous events worldwide.

Discography

Mixtapes

Singles

References

External links
Official website

Epic Records artists
Jamaican dancehall musicians
21st-century Jamaican women singers
People from the Bronx
People from Saint Catherine Parish
Jamaican emigrants to the United States
Jamaican reggae musicians
1991 births
Living people